Joseva Tamani (born 2 April 1997) is a Fijian rugby union player, currently playing for the . His preferred position is flanker.

Professional career
Tamani was named in the Fijian Drua squad for the 2022 Super Rugby Pacific season.

References

External links
itsrugby.co.uk Profile

1997 births
Living people
Fijian rugby union players
Rugby union flankers
Melbourne Rising players
Fijian Drua players